RNA, 28S ribosomal 1 is a protein that in humans is encoded by the RNA28S1 gene.

References